Drsnik, or Dërsnik or Dresnik ( or Dresniku), is a settlement in the Klina municipality of Kosovo.

History
During Early Middle Ages, Porphyrogenitus mentions the urban center of Desstinik. Archaeological discoveries from the Roman period were made here in August 2013.

During World War II, Drsnik was one of the many settlements in Kosovo where the Serb civilian population was persecuted and killed by Albanian paramilitaries.

Drsnik had a Serbian majority. In June 1999 the Serbian population fled due to war. Some Serbs returned to the village after five years, in June 2005. The interior of the church of St. Paraskeva, which dates back to the 16th century, was completely torched in June 1999. Some frescoes survived the fire; in 2005 funds were being collected for the church's repair and a restoration of the frescoes.

In 2009 there were arson attacks on two Serbian houses in Drsnik.

Population
In the 2011 census, the population was 1770.

Data for 1991 may not reflect the correct number of Albanians that year, as they largely boycotted that census.

Notes

References

Villages in Klina
Destroyed churches in Kosovo
Medieval Serbian sites in Kosovo